Thoman Burgkmair, or Thomas Burgkmair (died 1523) was a German painter.

Life
The father of Hans Burgkmair, and the father-in-law of Hans Holbein the elder, he is mentioned in the records of the Painters' Guild at Augsburg in 1460, and in public documents there in 1479. In 1480 he painted a Christ with St. Ulric and a Virgin with St. Elizabeth of Thuringia, both in the cathedral at Augsburg; the gallery of that city also possesses a picture by him of the Martyrdom of St. Stephen, St. Lawrence, and scenes from the Passion. Burgkmair died at Augsburg in 1523.

Gallery

References

Sources
 

Year of birth unknown
1523 deaths
15th-century German painters
German male painters
16th-century German painters